Jis Desh Mein Ganga Behti Hai is a 1960 Indian film directed by Radhu Karmakar and produced by Raj Kapoor. The film stars Padmini, Raj Kapoor and Pran in lead roles. This was the first directorial venture of Karmakar, who had previously been cinematographer for many of Kapoor's films. The film was the last B&W movie of Raj Kapoor. It was declared a "hit" at Box Office India.

The team of Shankar Jaikishan composed the songs, lyrics were written by Shailendra and Hasrat Jaipuri, including "O Basanti Pawan Pagal", "Aa Ab Laut Chalen", and "Hothon Pe Sacchai Rehti Hai".

The outdoor shooting with the marble rock background is done in Bhedaghat in Madhya Pradesh.

Plot

Raju (Raj Kapoor) is a poor, friendly orphan who wins his bread by singing songs. One day, he sees an injured man and helps him. Later, he is kidnapped by a few bandits who mistake him to be an undercover policeman. It then turns out that the injured man he helped is the leader (Sardar) of this gang. The Sardar takes good care of Raju and treats him with honour. Sardar's daughter Kammo (Padmini) falls in love with Raju. Kammo and Sardar convince Raju that they are good bandits who are making sure that wealth is equally distributed amongst people.

On one of the lootings, Raju witnesses the murder of a newlywed couple. He decides to go to the police and leaves the gang. One of the bandits, Raka (Pran), kills the Sardar and takes over, captures Raju; and tries to forcibly marry Kammo. Raju eloped and tells all the truth to the police, they decide to confront and kill the bandits. Raju begs the police to not kill them but is shunned. Raju is then posed in a dilemma of what to do and finds himself helpless when he sees police stooping just as low to stop crime. He then returns to the colony of dacoits to convince them to surrender to the police in order to ensure good and respectful life to their family, especially their children.

This movie was inspired by initiatives of Vinoba Bhave and Jayaprakash Narayan , on their call, hundreds of dacoits surrendered to police and mainstreamed to the society at large.

Cast
 Raj Kapoor as Raju
 Padmini as Kammo
 Pran  as Raka
 Chanchal as Bijli
 Lalita Pawar as Mirabai
 Raj Mehra as Police Superintendent
 Ramayan Tiwari as Mirabai's Husband 
 Nana Palsikar as Tau
 Nayampalli as Sardar
 Salochana Chatterjee as Police Superintendent's wife 
 Vishwa Mehra as Bhimu
 Baboo Rao
 S.K.Singh
 Rattan Gaurang
 Chang		
 Mohamed Ali	
 Anwari Bai
 Sadhana	
 Azim		
 Master Amar		
 Moolchand as Groom's father

Music
Composed by Shankar Jaikishan, lyrics by Shailendra and Hasrat Jaipuri.

Awards
The film won many prestigious awards at National Film Awards and Filmfare Awards. The film stood out at the 9th Filmfare Awards function by winning the most (four) awards in various categories from eight nominations.

 9th Filmfare Awards:

Won

 Best Film – Raj Kapoor
 Best Actor – Raj Kapoor
 Best Editing – G.G. Mayekar
 Best Art Direction – M. R. Acharekar

Nominated

 Best Director – Radhu Karmakar
 Best Actress – Padmini
 Best Supporting Actor – Pran
 Best Music Director – Shankar–Jaikishan
 Best Lyricist – Shailendra for "Hothon Pe Sacchai"
 Best Male Playback Singer – Mukesh for "Hothon Pe Sacchai"
National Film Awards:
 1960: Certificate of Merit for Best Feature Film in Hindi

Further reading
 Rajni Bakshi, "Raj Kapoor", in Ashis Nandy, ed., The Secret Politics of Our Desires: Innocence, Culpability and Indian Popular Cinema (Delhi: Palgrave Macmillan, 1998), 92-117.

References

External links
 

1960s Hindi-language films
1960 films
R. K. Films films
Films scored by Shankar–Jaikishan
1960 directorial debut films